Miguel Ángel Castro (born December 24, 1994) is a Dominican professional baseball pitcher for the Arizona Diamondbacks of Major League Baseball (MLB). He has previously played in MLB for the Toronto Blue Jays, Colorado Rockies, Baltimore Orioles, New York Mets and New York Yankees. Castro signed with the Blue Jays as an international free agent in 2012, and made his MLB debut in 2015.

Professional career

Toronto Blue Jays
Castro signed with the Toronto Blue Jays as an international free agent in 2012, and received a $43,000 signing bonus. He made his professional debut in 2012 with the Dominican Summer League Blue Jays, and earned a 3–2 record, 4.73 earned run average, and 20 strikeouts in 20 innings. Castro began the 2013 season with the Dominican Summer League Blue Jays, and was later promoted to the Gulf Coast League Blue Jays and Bluefield Blue Jays. In total, he posted a 6–2 record, 1.54 ERA, and 88 strikeouts in 70 innings pitched. His performance in the DSL earned him the Webster Award, given to the best Blue Jays prospect at each minor league level. In 2014, Castro continued his progression through the minor league system, earning promotions to the Vancouver Canadians, Lansing Lugnuts, and Dunedin Blue Jays. He earned an 8–3 record, a 2.69 ERA, and 78 strikeouts in 80 innings spread across three minor league levels.

Castro was invited to 2015 spring training but was considered to be a long-shot to make the team, and General Manager Alex Anthopoulos stated before camp began that Castro would likely begin the 2015 season in Dunedin. However, after pitching 6 scoreless innings over 4 appearances, with 4 strikeouts and no walks, many believed that Castro had earned a spot on the roster. After Steve Delabar was optioned to minor league camp on March 26, it was reported that Castro would likely make the Opening Day roster as a reliever. His role in the bullpen was confirmed on March 31.

Castro made his MLB debut on April 6, 2015, against the New York Yankees. He pitched 1 innings and closed out the game as the Blue Jays won 6–1. At 20 years, 103 days old, Castro became the youngest pitcher to appear for the Blue Jays, breaking a nearly 38-year-old record held by Víctor Cruz. His record was short-lived, however, as it was broken only two days later by teammate Roberto Osuna. After a poor season debut by Brett Cecil, Castro was temporarily moved to the closer role on April 9. He earned his first MLB save that night, closing out a 6–3 win over the Yankees. Castro was moved back into a regular relief role in the bullpen on April 28, after recording 4 saves in 6 opportunities. On May 3, Castro was optioned to the Triple-A Buffalo Bisons.

Colorado Rockies
On July 28, 2015, Castro was traded to the Colorado Rockies, along with José Reyes, Jeff Hoffman, and Jesús Tinoco, in exchange for Troy Tulowitzki and LaTroy Hawkins. The Rockies optioned him to the Triple-A Albuquerque Isotopes. He was called up by the Rockies on September 1 and made his Rockies debut that day. On April 2, 2017, Castro was designated for assignment.

Baltimore Orioles
On April 7, 2017, Castro was traded to the Baltimore Orioles for cash considerations or a player to be named later (Jon Keller). He debuted for the Orioles on May 17 against the Detroit Tigers, striking out one batter in one scoreless inning of relief. He pitched two scoreless innings the following day as well. In his first season with Baltimore, he posted an ERA of 3.53 in 39 games.

The following season, he appeared in 63 appearances, posting an ERA of 3.96 in  innings. He shared the major league lead in balks, with three. In 2019 for the Orioles, Castro appeared in 65 games, allowing a career-high 10 home runs in  innings of work, registering a 4.66 ERA.

New York Mets
On August 31, 2020, the Orioles traded Castro to the New York Mets for pitcher Kevin Smith and Victor Gonzalez. In 2020, Castro pitched in 26 games between the Orioles and Mets, recording a 4.01 ERA with 38 strikeouts in  innings pitched. In 2021, Castro recorded a career-low 3.45 ERA along with 77 strikeouts and 43 walks in  innings.

On March 22, 2022, Castro signed a $2.62 million contract with the Mets, avoiding salary arbitration.

New York Yankees
On April 3, 2022, the Mets traded Castro to the New York Yankees for Joely Rodríguez.

Arizona Diamondbacks
On December 2, 2022, Castro signed a one-year contract with an option for 2024 with the Arizona Diamondbacks.

Personal life
Castro was born in La Romana, Dominican Republic. His father was a boxer. Castro spent his $43,000 signing bonus on a prostate operation for his father, as well as a surgery to remove his mother's fibrous tumour.

References

External links

1994 births
Living people
People from La Romana, Dominican Republic
Albuquerque Isotopes players
Baltimore Orioles players
Bluefield Blue Jays players
Bowie Baysox players
Buffalo Bisons (minor league) players
Colorado Rockies players
Dominican Republic expatriate baseball players in Canada
Dominican Republic expatriate baseball players in the United States
Dominican Summer League Blue Jays players
Dunedin Blue Jays players
Gulf Coast Blue Jays players
Lansing Lugnuts players
Major League Baseball pitchers
Major League Baseball players from the Dominican Republic
New York Mets players
New York Yankees players
Toronto Blue Jays players
Vancouver Canadians players